The Peterbilt 281/351 is a line of tractor units built by Peterbilt that ran from 1954 until 1976. The 281 series had a single drive axle, the 351 two. It was very popular with truckers, with the 351 series outlasting the 281.

History

The Peterbilt 281 emerged from Peterbilt's assembly plant in Oakland, California in 1954.

It earned the nickname "Needlenose" from its narrow nose and butterfly hood, popular with truckers for ease of engine access and superior visibility. Like its companion series 351, it had only two small round headlights.

Remaining in production until 1976, the 281/351 was a durable and popular series. The basic design made way for different models, with tilt cab-over-engine models introduced in 1959.

A model 281 and 351 (the latter in some scenes) were featured in the made-for-TV movie Duel
 in 1971.

References

External links
 10-4 Magazine truck article, Duel Lives On!
 Official Peterbilt website

281
Vehicles introduced in 1954
Tractor units